Mossbridge railway station was located on Downholland Moss at Moss Lane, Haskayne, Lancashire, England. The Southport & Cheshire Lines Extension Railway (SCLER) opened Mossbridge on 5 April 1886 as "Barton & Halsall".

A short distance north of the station the line crossed Downholland Brook by a substantial bridge.

The station closed in 1917, along with all other stations on the extension line, as a World War I economy measure. Unlike all the others, however, Mossbridge never reopened to passengers.

This part of the SCLER now forms part of the Trans Pennine Trail.

References

Sources

External links
 The station and line with mileages railwaycodes
 The station's history Disused Stations
 The station on a 1948 O.S. map npe Maps
 The station on an 1888-1913 Overlay OS Map National Library of Scotland

Disused railway stations in the Borough of West Lancashire
Former Cheshire Lines Committee stations
Railway stations in Great Britain opened in 1886
Railway stations in Great Britain closed in 1917